Jorge Alberto Escamilla Moreno (born November 1, 1995, in Mexico City) is a Mexican professional footballer who currently plays for Pumas UNAM Premier.

References

External links
 
 

1995 births
Living people
Mexican footballers
Mexican expatriate footballers
Association football midfielders
Club Universidad Nacional footballers
Venados F.C. players
Fresno FC players
Ascenso MX players
Liga Premier de México players
USL Championship players
Mexican expatriate sportspeople in the United States
Expatriate soccer players in the United States
Footballers from Mexico City